Three on a Honeymoon is a 1934 American Pre-Code comedy film directed by James Tinling, written by Edward T. Lowe Jr. and Raymond Van Sickle, and starring Sally Eilers, ZaSu Pitts, Henrietta Crosman, Charles Starrett, Irene Hervey and Johnny Mack Brown. It is based on the 1932 novel Promenade Deck by Ishbel Ross. The film was released on March 23, 1934, by Fox Film Corporation.

Plot

Cast      
Sally Eilers as Joan Foster
ZaSu Pitts as Alice Mudge
Henrietta Crosman as 'Ma' Gillespie
Charles Starrett as Dick Charlton
Irene Hervey as Millicent Wells
Johnny Mack Brown as Chuck Wells
Russell Simpson as Ezra MacDuff
Cornelius Keefe as Phil Lang
Edward Earle as First Officer
Howard Lally as Third Officer
Wini Shaw as Singer

References

External links
 

1934 films
American comedy films
1934 comedy films
Fox Film films
Films directed by James Tinling
American black-and-white films
1930s English-language films
1930s American films